Al-Yamanyah al-Allya is a sub-district located in Al Husn District, Sana'a Governorate, Yemen. Al-Yamanyah al-Allya had a population of 30124 according to the 2004 census.

References 

Sub-districts in Al Husn District